Cross Mountain is the highest peak in the Bear Pond Mountains, a sub range of the Appalachian Mountains. This grouping of mountains straddle the Maryland and Pennsylvania border.

Cross Mountain and Hearthstone Mountain  which is on the Maryland side, form a unique geologic formation known as the "Punchbowl". This feature was created by the weathered shales of the Ordovician age in the center of a south-plunging anticline, having been eroded to expose a large amphitheater like feature (punchbowl). Cross and Hearthstone Mountain are made of hard resistant quartzite of the Tuscarora Formation of the Silurian age.

Cross Mountain is also the site of a deactivated microwave relay station, that was used during the Cold War. The unit was encased in a 103 ft. tower, and known as the "Cannonball" site 2. The site was closed in 1977. Access to the summit is still restricted.

References
Alan R. Geyer (1979) "Outstanding Geologic Features of Pennsylvania", Geological Survey of Pennsylvania

 

Albert LaFrance, Secret Cold War Landscape, Presidential Emergency Facilities Microwave Radio Relay Station Site 2 - "Cannonball" atop Cross Mountain, near Shimpstown, PA., Cold War webring, last update June 12, 1999.

Mountains of Pennsylvania
Landforms of Franklin County, Pennsylvania